Swapna is the Sanskrit word for the dreamstate. Swapna in Hindu philosophy is a state of consciousness when a person (or being) is dreaming in sleep. In this state, he or she cannot perceive the external universe with the senses. This state may contain the conscious activities of memory or imagination. It is typically compared with the states of wakeful consciousness (jagrat), deep sleep in which no cognition occurs (sushupti), and the fourth state known as turiya. These four states of consciousness are described in the Chandogya Upanishad and recur commonly in the literature of yoga.

See also
Dream Yoga
Yoga Nidra
Transpersonal Psychology
Process Oriented Psychology
Shamanism

References

Hindu philosophical concepts